The Speedway Champions Cup was an annual motorcycle speedway competition that took place between 1986 and 1993, featuring the national champions of the sixteen participating nations. It was discontinued with the introduction of the Speedway Grand Prix in 1995.

The 1986 championship was held at Pardubice and the winner was Erik Stenlund of Sweden.

Results
August 3, 1986
 Pardubice

References

Speedway Champions Cup
Champions Cup
Speedway Champions Cup